Georgios Κoutsias (born 8 February 2004) is a Greek professional footballer who plays as a striker for MLS club Chicago Fire.

Career

PAOK
In 2012, Koutsias moved to PAOK from Tilemachos Alexandria.

On 18 September 2020, Koutsias made his professional debut in a 1–1 home draw against Atromitos. Less than three months later on 10 December 2020, he made his Europa League debut in a 0–0 away draw against Granada becoming the 16th youngest player in Europa League's history at the time and the second youngest Greek (after Charalampos Mavrias).

Chicago Fire
On 28 February 2023, Koutsias signed with Major League Soccer side Chicago Fire for an undisclosed fee.

Personal life
Koutsias is from Trikala, Imathia. His father, Nikos, is a former amateur footballer.

Honours
PAOK
Greek Cup: 2020–21

References

2004 births
Living people
Competitors at the 2022 Mediterranean Games
Chicago Fire FC players
Greek footballers
Greece under-21 international footballers
Greece youth international footballers
Major League Soccer players
Super League Greece players
Super League Greece 2 players
PAOK FC players
Association football forwards
Footballers from Alexandreia, Greece
Footballers from Thessaloniki
PAOK FC B players
Volos N.F.C. players